The Anyuy (Öñüüy) is a river in the Sakha Republic, Russia.

The Anyuy begins in a swampy area at the confluence of the Bolshoy Anyuy ("Great Anyuy") from the south, and the Maly Anyuy ("Little Anyuy") from the east, shortly before their combined waters flow into the Kolyma. Therefore the length of the Anyuy proper is just .

The Anyuy may stay under the ice for up to nine months. The area is covered with tundra, marshes and small lakes.

References

Rivers of the Sakha Republic